The Kush Democratic Majority Party is a political party in South Sudan led by Bol Gai Deng.

References

Black political parties
Conservative parties in Africa
Federalist parties
Pan-Africanist political parties in Africa
Political parties in South Sudan
Political parties with year of establishment missing